Pavle Julinac (1730–1785) was a Serbian writer, philosopher, historian, traveler, soldier, and diplomat in the Imperial Russian service. As a historiographer, Julinac's "A Short Introduction to the History of the Slavo-Serbian People" published in Venice in 1765 was the most significant historical oeuvre of the period. Ten years later, Julinac's translation of Marmontel's "Bélisaire" became one of the most prominent works of the Enlightenment in Serbian literature, thanks to dramatists Marko Jelisejić (1760-1833), Joakim Vujić and others. The work of Marmontel soon popularized the philosophical ideas of the Enlightenment in Austria among the large Slavo-Serbian population there and in Russia.

Julinac was a contemporary of not only Jean-Francois Marmontel, but also of Serbian intellectuals like the polymaths Teodor Janković-Mirijevski, Dositej Obradović, Zaharije Orfelin, Jovan Rajić, Emanuilo Janković, Vasilije Damjanović, Pavel Kengelac, and others.

Biography
Some say that Pavle Julinac was born in Segedin; others believe it was in Čurug. He comes from a noble Serbian Military Frontier family, the son of an Austrian soldier Arsenije Julinac, and the nephew of Major Vasilije Julinac of Segedin. Pavle attended the Lyceum in Pozun (Bratislava) from 1747 to 1753, studying the works of such well-known authors as Christian Wolff's "Psychologia rationalis" (1734) and "Cosmologia generalis" (1731), Alexander Gottlieb Baumgarten's "Metaphysica" (1739) and "Ethica philosophica" (1748), and several philosophical encyclopedias by F. C. Baumeister. Upon graduation, Julinac spoke Serbian, Slovak, German, Hungarian, Romanian, Russian, and French, and held the greatest esteem for his teacher and mentor, Slovak historian Jovan Tomka Saksi. (Saski thought that geography is a natural introduction to historical treatises, so he paid special attention to Serbian geography). His classmate was Vasilije Damjanović (1734-1792).

The following facts seem certain: he was the son of a Serbian officer in the Austrian army who on retirement had been rewarded with a patent of nobility. A title and an estate too small to support his numerous family Pavle was entrusted to the care of his wealthy godfather, then Lieutenant Colonel Jovan Šević, who took Pavle after graduation with him to Russia. Pavle eventually entered the Russian military service and was assigned to the Russian embassy in Vienna as a courier.

Slavo-Serbia and New Serbia
At the time free lands in Slavo-Serbia and New Serbia (historical province) were being offered to Serbs, Vlahs, and other Balkan people of Orthodox Christian denomination to ensure frontier protection and development of this part of Southern steppes. Slavo-Serbia was directly governed by Russia's Governing Senate. Pavle Julianc joined the mass of settlers leaving Austria for Russia, led by Rajko Preradović and Jovan Šević, his godfather. Both Preradović and Šević soon became the commandants of Slavo-Serbia. The Serbian and Vlah settlers eventually formed the Bakhmut hussar regiment in 1764. These two colonels led their soldiers in various military campaigns, in peacetime they kept the borderlands, along with the Cossacks, free from incursions by other states. Upon his arrival in Russia, Julinac immediately entered the Russian military service. In the following years, he won his colonelcy on the field of battle. Empress Elizabeth of Russia had long ago adopted the dangerous policy of remodeling the Russian army to turn into a more potent Russian Orthodox force, and Julinac, whose family adhered to the same faith—Eastern Orthodoxy—as the Russians, was selected to assist in this organization. During the reign of Catherine the Great, Julinac was appointed to the Russian Embassy in Vienna as a courier in 1761. Working under the protection of Prince Dmitry Mikhailovich Golitsyn (1721-1793), the Russian ambassador to Vienna from 1761 to 1793, Julinac was given a mission to liaise between Russia and the disfranchised Serbs whose territories were under both the Habsburg and Ottoman rule since the 15th century. Later, he was active in recruiting Serbian Austrians and Serbian Hungarians into the Russian military service. In 1781, Julinac is made Russian consul in Naples, while still in military service. As consul in the Port of Naples, he was charged with the duty of attending to the Russian seamen's interests there and other tasks. (It is a misdemeanor wrongfully to force a sailor on shore, or otherwise wrongfully leave him in any place before the completion of a voyage for which he was engaged). Julinac would address such issues and many other complicated ones that befall a consul in a foreign land. Eventually, ill-health would compel him to return to Austria to the Russian Embassy, and he died in Vienna on the 25th of February 1785.

Works
He is best known for four books, each with a historical and literary significance of the time.

Today students of Serbian historiography remember Bishop Vasilije Petrović Njegoš's "History of Montenegro" largely because it is the first published history by a Serb. (Though George Branković's "Chronicles" were first written between the 1690s and early 1700s; they remained, however, in manuscript form for a long time).

Among the Serbian books published in Venice during the eighteenth century, there was the first real Serbian history, written by Julinac in 1765 with a long title: "A Short Introduction to the History of the Slavo-Serbian People". Julinac's books were printed in the Greco-Orthodox typography of Dimitrije Teodosije, a printer of Greek origin.

Pavle Julinac, however, wrote " in the hope that the Almighty might be pleased to deliver all the Serbs from the barbarian yoke," a statement that sounds very much like a precursor to an ideology of national liberation after many waves of abuse Austrians levied on the Serbs. But Julinac added " and give them such gracious masters as the Austrian rulers (sic)." Julinac, an officer in the Russian army and a diplomatist who spent most of his life in the service of Imperial Russia, knew when and when not to rattle the proverbial cage of the powerful.

Marmontel's Belisaire was the first French novel translated into Serbian and published by Pavle Julinac in the year 1775.

Julinac also translated The Song of Roland, an epic poem based on the Battle of Roncevaux in 778, during the reign of Charlemagne who became one of the principal figures in the literary cycle as Matter of France.

He wrote his memoirs and a travel book of his visit to Hilandar Monastery at Mount Athos.

His contemporary, the famous Serbian man of letter, Dositej Obradović, called him "Major Julinac," the highest military rank he attained while in the Russian military and diplomatic service.

See also
 Jovan Horvat
 Ivan Lukačević (soldier)
 Jovan Šević
 Jovan Albanez
 Simeon Piščević
 Anto Gvozdenović
 Mikhail Miloradovich
 Semyon Zorich
 Peter Tekeli
 Georgi Emmanuel
 Marko Ivelich

References

 From Serbian Wikipedia: Павле Јулинац
 Adapted and translated from Jovan Skerlić's Istorija nove srpske književnosti (Belgrade, 1921) pages 47–50

18th-century Serbian historians
Serbian soldiers
Serbian diplomats
1730 births
1785 deaths
Habsburg Serbs